Manuel de los Cobos, 4th Marquess of Camarasa, (circa 1606 - Sardinia, 21 June 1668), 

His father was Diego de los Cobos y de Guzman, who was awarded the title of Duke of Sabiote on 10 October 1626.
Manuel de los Cobos was a Grandee of Spain, Viceroy of Valencia (1659–1663) and Viceroy of Sardinia (1665-1668), where he was  assassinated on 21 June  1668. He was also 4th Marquess of Camarasa since 1645, 2nd Duke of Sabiote, 2nd Marquess of Estepa and 2nd Marquess of Laula, 10th Count of Ribadavia, 8th Count of Castrogeriz, 3rd Count of Villazopeque, 4th Count of Ricla and many other lesser titles.

His son and successor to the title of 5th Marquess of Camarasa was Baltasar de los Cobos y Portocarrero, a Knight of the Order of the Golden Fleece and Viceroy of Aragon, from his 2nd wife, Isabel de Portocarrero y de Luna, (1627–1694), daughter of Cristobal de Portocarrero, 3rd Count of Montijo.

References
 http://www.grandesp.org.uk/historia/gzas/camarasa.htm

1668 deaths
Marquesses of Spain
Viceroys of Valencia
Viceroys of Sardinia
Assassinated Spanish people
Grandees of Spain
Knights of the Golden Fleece
1600s births